Show Business (stylized as $how Bu$ine$$) is the sixth album by the American hard rock band Kix. It was released in 1995 through CMC International, following their departure from Atlantic Records. Kix supported the album with a North American tour.

The album was a commercial flop. Show Business was the band's last album before their long-term breakup.

Critical reception

Rolling Stone wrote that "there remains something oddly lovable about this goofy group of hard-rock power popsters who seem to have been going at it forever with only limited commercial success." The Deseret News deemed the album "light-hearted rock with lots of innuendo but not much substance."

Track listing
 "Ball Baby" (Purnell, Bob Halligan Jr., Martin Briley) – 4:46
 "9-1-1" (Purnell, John Palumbo) – 4:38
 "Fireballs" (Purnell, Halligan Jr.) – 4:08
 "Baby Time Bomb" (Purnell, Taylor Rhodes) – 4:22
 "Book to Hypnotize" (Purnell) – 4:07
 "Put My Money Where Your Mouth Is" (Purnell, Steve Whiteman) – 5:21
 "She Loves Me Not" (Purnell, Halligan Jr.) – 7:23
 "Fire Boy" (Purnell, Palumbo) – 3:23
 "I'm Bombed" (Purnell, Palumbo) – 5:07
 "If You Run Around" (Purnell) – 4:23

Credits
Kix
Steve Whiteman – lead vocals, harmonica, saxophone
Ronnie "10/10" Younkins – guitars
Brian "Damage" Forsythe – guitars
Donnie Purnell – bass, keyboards, backing vocals, producer, mixing
Jimmy "Chocolate" Chalfant – drums, percussion, backing vocals, engineer

Additional musicians
Paul Chalfant – viola on "If You Run Around"

Production
Zac Mabie – engineer
George Marino – mastering at Sterling Sound, New York

References

External links
Kix Official Website
Guitar.com 2014 interview with Kix guitarist Brian Forsythe

1995 albums
Kix (band) albums
CMC International albums